Aryan Dutt (born 12 May 2003) is a Dutch cricketer. In March 2021, he was named in the Netherlands' Twenty20 International (T20I) squad for the 2020–21 Nepal Tri-Nation Series. The Dutch coach, Ryan Campbell, said that Dutt was an exciting prospect when he was named in the squad. He made his T20I debut for the Netherlands, against Nepal, on 17 April 2021. Prior to his call-up to the national side, Dutt had also played at under-18 and under-19 level for the Netherlands.

Career 
In May 2021, he was named in the Netherlands A squad for their series against the Ireland Wolves. He made his List A debut on 12 May 2021, for the Netherlands A team against the Ireland Wolves, during their tour of Ireland. Later the same month, he was named in the Dutch One Day International (ODI) squad for their series against Scotland. He made his ODI debut on 19 May 2021, for the Netherlands against Scotland. In June 2022, during the ODI series against the West Indies, Dutt took the wicket of captain Nicholas Pooran in all three matches, preventing him from scoring above 10 runs each game.

References

External links
 

2003 births
Living people
Dutch cricketers
Netherlands One Day International cricketers
Netherlands Twenty20 International cricketers
Place of birth missing (living people)